Delphine Software International was a French video game developer. They were famous for publishing Another World and creating the cinematic platform game Flashback, which bore a similarity to Prince of Persia, both in gameplay and in its use of rotoscoped animation. They were also known for their Moto Racer series.

History
Delphine Software International (DSI) was created in 1988 as a part of the Delphine Group and was initially based in Paris. It was headed by Paul de Senneville, and co-directed by Paul Cuisset, who was the company lead designer.

In 1993, a subsidiary company named Adeline Software International was created. In 2001, DSI relocated to Saint-Ouen. In December 2002, the company was removed from the Delphine Group. In February 2003, Delphine Software was sold to French game development company Doki Denki. Doki Denki closed down in July 2004 after bankruptcy and liquidation. Their official website has since shut down. As a consequence, Adeline also shut down around the same time.

Game titles

References

External links
Delphine Software International at MobyGames

Video game companies established in 1988
Video game companies disestablished in 2004
Defunct video game companies of France
French companies established in 1988
French companies disestablished in 2004